The 2021 season is the Geelong Football Club's 122nd season in the Australian Football League (AFL), the eleventh with Chris Scott as senior coach and tenth with Joel Selwood as captain.

Geelong participated in the 2021 Marsh Community Series as part of its pre-season schedule, and the club's home-and-away season began 20 March against  at the Adelaide Oval where they lost by 12 points. Geelong rallied during the season, winning 12 of their last 16 games to finish 3rd on the ladder.

Season Summary

Results

Ladder

Reserves team 
The club's reserves team, participating in the VFL, was coached by Shane O'Bree for a sixth season. Aaron Black was named captain, with Darcy Lang vice captain.

The reserves team finished the 2021 VFL season with a 7-2 win–loss record and placed fourth on the league's ladder and would have qualified for the finals series, had the season not been curtailed due to restrictions caused by the COVID-19 pandemic in Victoria.

Notes

References

External links 
 Official website of the Geelong Football Club
 Official website of the Australian Football League

Geelong Football Club
Geelong Football Club seasons